Sefedin Braho (born 18 August 1953) is an Albanian retired footballer who played as a centre forward for Luftëtari and Partizani in Albania.

International career
He made his debut for Albania in a May 1973 FIFA World Cup qualification match against Romania in Tirana and earned a total of 9 caps, scoring 1 goal. His final international was a June 1983 European Championship qualification match against Austria.

National team statistics

Honours
Albanian Superliga: 1
 1971

References

External links

Sefedin Braho at 11v11.com

1953 births
Living people
Footballers from Gjirokastër
Albanian footballers
Association football forwards
Albania international footballers
Albania under-23 international footballers
Albania under-21 international footballers
Luftëtari Gjirokastër players
FK Partizani Tirana players
Kategoria Superiore players